Athletics at the 2020 Summer Olympics were held during the last ten days of the Games. They were due to be held from 31 July – 9 August 2020, at the Olympic Stadium in Tokyo, Japan.  Due to the COVID-19 pandemic, the games were postponed to 2021, with the track and field events set for 30 July – 8 August. The sport of athletics at these Games was split into three distinct sets of events: track and field events, remaining in Tokyo, and road running events and racewalking events, moved to Sapporo. A total of 48 events were held, one more than in 2016, with the addition of a mixed relay event.

Olympic stadium and venues

Road events (marathons and racewalks) will take place at Odori Park in Sapporo, but the National Stadium, which will be known as the Olympic Stadium during the games, completely rebuilt and inaugurated on 21 December 2019, will be the venue of all the track and field events.

Italian company Mondo equipped the stadium with a new track, a Mondotrack WS surface which was given a seal of approval with a World Athletics "Class 1 certificate" in December 2019. The Mondotrack WS surface in Tokyo's National Stadium is an improved version of the product that was provided and installed for the 2016 Summer Games in Rio.

Odori Park is the traditional venue of Hokkaido Marathon. From the 2012 edition of the race, the start of the race was moved from Nakajima Park to Odori Park. Sapporo, which hosted the 1972 Winter Olympics, lies 800 km from Tokyo, but was named as the venue for the Olympic marathons and racewalking in October 2019. This decision, taken before COVID-19 crisis, was made due to fears about high temperatures in Tokyo. Odori Park will be the start and the arrival for both marathons. Its route features a large loop which is about the length of a half-marathon (20 km), followed by a second smaller loop (10 km) which was completed twice.

Schedule 

Apart from the race walks and marathon, nine track and field events will hold finals in the morning session to ensure that they receive maximum visibility for the sport across all time zones. On 16 October 2019, the IOC announced that there were plans to re-locate the marathon and racewalking events to Sapporo due to heat concerns. The plans were made official on 1 November 2019 after Tokyo Governor Yuriko Koike accepted the IOC's decision, despite her belief that the events should have remained in Tokyo.

Qualification

The 2020 athletics qualifying system for individual events was fundamentally different from previous versions. Instead of being only based on set qualifying standards, the new qualifying system is also based on IAAF World Rankings. Qualifying standards provided an alternate pathway, but are to be set high enough that only exceptional performances will meet them. Maximum entries per event were set (unlike previous years where entries were based on how many athletes met the qualifying standard), with the world rankings being used to fill the quota after the standards-based entrants and universality entrants are set.

On 2 June 2021, Sebastian Coe, president of World Athletics, declared that "our tracking suggests that about 70 percent of athletes in most events will qualify by entry standard. This is above the 50 percent rate we aimed for in devising the system, but we believe this is due to the extended qualifying period created after the postponement of the Olympic Games from 2020 to 2021."

For relays, the qualification is somewhat similar to previous years. Eight teams will be selected through the results at the 2019 World Championships in Athletics, then adding the finalists of 2021 World Athletics Relays if different ones and some more selected through top lists' rankings, up to 16 teams by event.

Record figures

3 world records and 12 Olympic records were set. 
28 continental (area) records were set along with 151 national ones.

According to the international governing body for the sport of athletics, World Athletics, their performance ranking system concludes that the 2020 Olympic Games were the "highest quality major event in history".

Medal summary

Medal table
Key

Men

* Indicates the athlete only competed in the preliminary heats and received medals.
  On 18 February 2022 team of Great Britain was disqualified for doping use and officially stripped of the silver medal. Medals have not yet been reallocated.

Women

* Indicates the athlete only competed in the preliminary heats and received medals.

Mixed

* Indicates the athlete only competed in the preliminary heats and received medals.

Competitors

Placing table 
The Placing table assigns points to the top eight athletes in the final, with eight points to first place, seven to second place, and so on until one point for eighth place. Teams or athletes that did not finish or were disqualified do not receive points.

See also
Athletics at the 2018 Asian Games
Athletics at the 2018 Commonwealth Games
Athletics at the 2018 Summer Youth Olympics
Athletics at the 2019 African Games
Athletics at the 2019 European Games
Athletics at the 2019 Pacific Games
Athletics at the 2019 Pan American Games
Athletics at the 2020 Summer Paralympics

References

External links
 Results book 

 
2020
2020 Summer Olympics events
Olympics
International athletics competitions hosted by Japan
2020 Olympics